Cielo sin estrellas is a Mexican telenovela produced by Telesistema Mexicano.

Cast 
 Germán Robles

References 

Mexican telenovelas
1961 telenovelas
Televisa telenovelas
1961 Mexican television series debuts
1961 Mexican television series endings
Spanish-language telenovelas